Raymond Peak is a 10,014-foot-elevation (3,052 meter) mountain summit located in Alpine County, California, United States.

Description
It is situated in the Sierra Nevada mountain range, with precipitation runoff from the peak draining into tributaries of the Carson River. The Pacific Crest Trail traverses three-quarters of the circumference of the base of the mountain, providing an approach option from Ebbetts Pass or Lower Sunset Lake. The jagged volcanic pinnacles that form Raymond Peak are visible from Highway 395 when travelling southbound from Carson City, Nevada, approximately 30 miles distant.

Etymology

The Whitney Survey named this landform in 1865, and the toponym has been officially adopted by the U.S. Board on Geographic Names to honor Rossiter W. Raymond (1840–1918), an American mining engineer, legal scholar and author. His books contained reports about the state of mining activity in Alpine County. The names of nearby geographical features such as Raymond Lake, Raymond Canyon Creek, Raymond Meadows, and Raymond Meadows Creek are derived from the peak.

Climate
According to the Köppen climate classification system, Raymond Peak is located in an alpine climate zone. Most weather fronts originate in the Pacific Ocean and travel east toward the Sierra Nevada mountains. As fronts approach, they are forced upward by the peaks (orographic lift), causing them to drop their moisture in the form of rain or snowfall onto the range.

Gallery

See also

References

External links
 Weather forecast: Raymond Peak

North American 3000 m summits
Mountains of Northern California
Mountains of the Sierra Nevada (United States)
Mountains of Alpine County, California
Humboldt–Toiyabe National Forest